Arturo Maximo Yamasaki Maldonado also known as Arturo Yamasaki (11 May 1929 Lima, Peru - 23 July 2013 Mexico City, Mexico) was a Peruvian-Mexican international football referee. He represented the Peruvian Football Association from 1960 to 1966, then he emigrated to Mexico, where he also took citizenship and represented Mexico Football Association until end of his referee career.

Career 
He was FIFA referee in 1961–1974. He officiated totally 31 international matches. He refereed 5 matches in three World Cups 1962 (3), 1966 (1) and 1970 (1). He also officiated 3 matches in World Cup qualifying (CONCACAF zone) 1962 (1) and 1970 (2). He was referee of 1963 Copa America in 6 matches and officiated 2 matches in Copa America 1967 qualifying. He also officiated 2 matches in 1968 Olympic Games. He also attributed 8 international friendly matches in 1960–73.

Below his World Cup matches that officiated: 

Yamasaki sent off two players in the 1962 World Cup quarter final match between Yugoslavia and West Germany, and more famously, Garrincha in the semifinal between Brazil and hosts Chile; however, Garrincha was allowed to play the final because Yamasaki did not remain in Chile long enough to uphold the one-match ban on the Brazilian.
About Game of Century according to some German players, Yamasaki favored the Italians and German player Uwe Seeler wrote in his memoirs in 2003 Thank you, football also about this match that: ...Referee Yamasaki was completely on the side of the Italians.... But in TV recordings of this scene, in which Beckenbauer injured himself, with showing of slow motion the former national coach Sepp Herberger said that this scene cannot justify a penalty kick and referee's decision was impartial.

In club football he officiated 23 Copa Libertadores matches include 2 Final matches in 1965 and a match in 1965 Intercontinental Cup Final (2nd leg) played between Independiente and Inter Milan 0:0

Personal life 
Yamasaki was of Japanese Peruvian descent. After finishing his active referee career Arturo Yamasaki was the member of referee committee of the Mexican Football Association. In 2003 he was appointed president of the Mexican Arbitration Commission.

Awards 
In 1978, FIFA awarded him with a "Referees’ Special Award".

References and notes

External links 

 Profile - eu-football.info
 Profile - www.worldfootball.net
 Profile - footballfacts.ru (ru)

1929 births
2013 deaths
Peruvian sportspeople
Mexican football referees
Peruvian football referees
FIFA World Cup referees
1962 FIFA World Cup referees
1966 FIFA World Cup referees
1970 FIFA World Cup referees
Olympic football referees
Peruvian people of Japanese descent
Mexican people of Japanese descent